Crooked Creek is a tributary of the Allegheny River in both Armstrong and Indiana counties in the U.S. state of Pennsylvania.

Several covered bridges span the stream and its tributaries in Indiana County. The Thomas Covered Bridge crosses Crooked Creek in Armstrong Township. The Harmon's Covered Bridge crosses the South Branch Plum Creek and the Trusal Covered Bridge crosses Plum Creek, tributaries of Crooked Creek, in Washington Township.

Course

Crooked Creek joins the Allegheny River in both Bethel and Manor townships.

Tributaries

(Mouth at the Allegheny River)

Campbell Run
Elbow Run
Horney Camp Run
Coal Bank Run
Beers Run
Pine Run
Cherry Run
North Branch Cherry Run
Fagley Run
Long Run
Sugar Run
Lindsay Run
Craig Run
Gobblers Run
Plum Creek
Dutch Run
Cessna Run
South Branch
Mudlick Run
Sugarcamp Run
Reddings Run
Leisure Run
Goose Run
North Branch
Walker Run
Anthony Run
Curry Run
Cheese Run
Mitchell Run
Dark Hollow Run
Fulton Run
McKee Run
Twomile Run
Pine Run
Brush Run
Rayne Run

Political subdivisions
Crooked Creek traverses the following political subdivisions, named in order they are first encountered traveling downstream:
Rayne Township, Indiana County
Washington Township, Indiana County
Creekside
White Township, Indiana County
Armstrong Township, Indiana County
Plumcreek Township, Armstrong County
South Bend Township, Armstrong County
Burrell Township, Armstrong County
Bethel Township, Armstrong County
Kittanning Township, Armstrong County
Manor Township, Armstrong County

See also

 List of rivers of Pennsylvania
 List of tributaries of the Allegheny River

References

External links

U.S. Geological Survey: PA stream gaging stations
Crooked Creek Watershed Association

Rivers of Pennsylvania
Tributaries of the Allegheny River
Rivers of Armstrong County, Pennsylvania
Rivers of Indiana County, Pennsylvania